Eneodes viridulus is a species of longhorn beetles of the subfamily Lamiinae. It was described by Fisher in 1942, and is known from Cuba.

References

Beetles described in 1942
Endemic fauna of Cuba
Acanthocinini